The 1994 NCAA Division I softball tournament was the thirteenth annual tournament to determine the national champion of NCAA women's collegiate softball. Held during May 1994, thirty-two Division I college softball teams contested the championship. The tournament featured eight regionals of four teams, each in a double elimination format. The 1994 Women's College World Series was held in Oklahoma City, Oklahoma from May 26 through May 30 and marked the conclusion of the 1994 NCAA Division I softball season.  Arizona won their third championship, and second consecutive, by defeating  4–0 in the final game. It was the first final game since 1986 to not feature UCLA.

Qualifying

Regionals

Regional No. 1

UIC qualifies for WCWS

Regional No. 2

UCLA qualifies for WCWS

Regional No. 3

Cal State Northridge qualifies for WCWS

Regional No. 4

Utah qualifies for WCWS

Regional No. 5

Missouri qualifies for WCWS

Regional No. 6

Fresno State qualifies for WCWS

Regional No. 7

Oklahoma State qualifies for WCWS

Regional No. 8

Arizona qualifies for WCWS

Women's College World Series

Participants
Arizona

Bracket

Championship Game

All-Tournament Team
The following players were named to the All-Tournament Team

References

1994 NCAA Division I softball season
NCAA Division I softball tournament